Karmine Corp (or simply KCorp) is a professional esports organization incorporated in Tours and headquartered in Paris, France. The team employs professional players across six divisions, namely League of Legends, TrackMania, Teamfight Tactics, Super Smash Bros. Ultimate, Valorant and Rocket League.

Founded as Kameto Corp on 30 March 2020 by Twitch streamer duo Kamel "Kameto" Kebir and Zouhair "Kotei" Darji, the team took its current name when rapper and entrepreneur Amine "Prime" Mekri joined it as a founding member and joint owner on 16 November 2020. Under its new leadership, the organization underwent a major restructuring and purchased Nantes-based Team Oplon's Ligue française de League of Legends (or LFL) slot, thereby replacing it beginning with the 2021 season of France's top-level national league.

As of 2022, Karmine Corp's League of Legends division is the current European Masters titleholder. With their 2022 European Masters Spring Split victory, they became the first team to win it thrice, as well as the first team to win it hat-trick. Karmine Corp's Rocket League team also won the WePlay Esports Invitational (EMEA region) in 2021.

Divisions

Valorant 
Karmine Corp entered Valorant in May 2022, signing the roster of Amilwa, mikee, Shin, TakaS and Newzera. On 22 September 2022, they were announced as one of the 10 partner teams for the Valorant EMEA league.

Rosters

Tournament results

References

External links 
 

Esports teams based in France
Esports teams established in 2020
Rocket League teams
European Regional League teams